Little Willy can refer to:

 Little Willy (song) by the Sweet
 Little Willie, a British tank
 Little Willie rhymes, macabre poetic personification of youthful mischief
 Little Willy Foster, an American Chicago blues musician
 Little Willie Jackson, an American jazz and rhythm & blues saxophonist and bandleader
 Little Willie John, an American rhythm and blues singer
 Little Willie Jones, an American soul singer and musician
 Little Willie Littlefield, an American rhythm & blues and boogie-woogie pianist and singer
 Willie Tonga, an Australian professional rugby league footballer
 Little Willy Wonka, a fictional character in Roald Dahl's children's novels
 The Little Willies, an American alternative country music group
 A nickname for William, German Crown Prince
 Little Willie Pearl, the 44-grain pearl from a River Tay mussel